"Il était une fois nous deux" ("Once Upon a Time There Were We Two")  is a song by Joe Dassin from his 1976 album Le Jardin du Luxembourg.

The song was based on the song "Monja Monja" written by Toto Cutugno and Vito Pallavicini and originally released by Toto Cutugno's band . It was adapted into French by Claude Lemesle and Pierre Delanoë.

Released in 1976 as a single, in France it was number one on the singles sales chart for two consecutive weeks from June 17 to June 30, 1976.

Track listing 
7" single (CBS 4433)
 "Il était une fois nous deux" (3:55)
 "Les aventuriers" (2:40)

Charts

References 

1976 songs
1976 singles
Joe Dassin songs
French songs
CBS Records singles
Songs written by Pierre Delanoë
Number-one singles in France
Songs with lyrics by Vito Pallavicini
Songs written by Toto Cutugno
Songs written by Claude Lemesle
Song recordings produced by Jacques Plait